A constitutional referendum was held in Guinea on 21 October 1945 as part of the wider French constitutional referendum. Both questions were approved by large margins. Voter turnout was 73.5%.

Results

Question I

Question II

References

1945 referendums
October 1945 events in Africa
1945
1945 in Guinea
Constitutional referendums in France